Lorenzo 1992 is the fifth studio album by Italian singer-songwriter Jovanotti, released by FRI Records on 5 April 1992.

The album reached number four on the FIMI Singles Chart.

Track listing

Musicians

Charts and certifications

Charts

Certifications

References

1992 albums
Jovanotti albums
Italian-language albums